"You Need to Calm Down" is a song recorded by American singer-songwriter Taylor Swift. It was released on June 14, 2019, as the second single from her seventh studio album, Lover (2019). The fourteenth track on the album, Swift wrote and produced the song with Joel Little. "You Need to Calm Down" is an upbeat electropop and synth-pop song, with a chorus of ascending echoes. Its lyrics see Swift address internet trolls and homophobes, voicing her support for the LGBTQ+ community.

An accompanying lyric video was released on June 14, 2019. The music video was released on June 17, featuring an ensemble cast, directed by Swift and Drew Kirsch, and executive-produced by Swift and Todrick Hall. "You Need to Calm Down" divided music critics, some of whom praised the song for its catchiness and pro-LGBTQ+ message, while few others criticized its theme as confusing and cynical. Nevertheless, "You Need to Calm Down" is regarded as a gay anthem. The single reached number one in Scotland, and the top five in Australia, Canada, Ireland, Malaysia, New Zealand and the United Kingdom. It debuted at the second spot on the US Billboard Hot 100, becoming the second consecutive top-two single from Lover and tying Swift with Madonna for the most number-two hits for a female artist in the chart's history.

At the 2019 MTV Video Music Awards, the "You Need to Calm Down" music video received nine nominations, winning two: Video of the Year, which is Swift's second win in the category following "Bad Blood" (2015), and the Video for Good. The song also received a nomination for Best Pop Solo Performance at the 62nd Grammy Awards.

Background and release

On April 26, 2019, the title of the song was teased in the intro for the music video for "Me!" when Brendon Urie shouted the title in French. Later, it was revealed an "old-timey, 1940s-sounding instrumental version" of the song played in the background in the scene. On June 13, 2019, Swift announced on a livestream on Instagram that her upcoming album's second single, entitled "You Need to Calm Down", was to be released at midnight EDT on June 14 (04:00 UTC).

A lyric video for the song was released together with the song on YouTube. The video contained several easter eggs, including changing the word "glad" to GLAAD, and highlighting "EA" letters as a reference to the Equality Act. The references followed Swift's donation to GLAAD in support of Pride Month, and Swift's Change.org petition for the United States Senate to pass the Equality Act. The petition has attracted more than 500,000 signatures, including from Democrats such as Cory Booker, Elizabeth Warren, Beto O'Rourke, and Kirsten Gillibrand. Following the release of the song, GLAAD reported an "influx" of donations in the amount of $13, a reference to Swift's favorite number. A vertical video premiered exclusively on Spotify on June 24, 2019.

A remix for the song by British electronic music band Clean Bandit was released on August 20, 2019.

Critical reception
Music critics were divided with "You Need to Calm Down". Dan Stubbs from NME called the song "withering in its measured response", concluding it was "an infectious, bite-size pop package". Gwen Ihnat of The A.V. Club wrote that the song "clearly and refreshingly combats homophobia and anti-gay bias". Maeve McDermott and Joshua Bote, writing for USA Today, considered the song "an improvement" over the previous single "Me!", and "a more promising example of what fans can expect" from the album. Mikael Wood of the Los Angeles Times also concurred that the song was "a big creative improvement" over "Me!", while commenting the "explicit pro-gay message is certainly welcome, but it also feels just the slightest bit cynical". Time's Raisa Bruner wrote that the song is "bright, bubbly and unabashedly vying for earworm status", and that it is a "colorful clapback that works as a warning to homophobes, trolls and bullies". She added that Swift is "sing-talking her way through a series of quotable lyrics, over a "juicy, unhurried" synth beat. Bruner further stated that, at this song, Swift is "at her most pop-forward" on Lover, owing to its cascading chorus echoes.

Michelle Kim of Pitchfork wrote that, while the song is "well-intentioned" and the allyship deserved some praise, it is also "bewildering and underwhelming at the same time". Justin Kirkland of Esquire wrote the song "misses the point of being an LGBTQ ally" by "equating online haters with the personal and societal struggle of LGBTQ+ people". Similarly, Spencer Kornhaber from The Atlantic criticised the song's "breathtaking argument... that famous people are persecuted in a way meaningfully comparable to queer people." Will Gottsegen of Spin wrote the song's "easy, inoffensive lyrics... feel engineered to appeal to the broadest possible demographic", and that the song "plays it too safe" and "feels a little like a cop out". Constance Grady of Vox called the song "exhausting", comparing the song unfavorably to "Mean" (2011), another single from Swift.

Herald-Tribune named "You Need to Calm Down" as the second best song of 2019.

Commercial performance

In the United States, "You Need to Calm Down" debuted and peaked at number two on the Billboard Hot 100, becoming the second top two hit from Lover. Like in the case of lead single "Me!", "Old Town Road" by Lil Nas X featuring Billy Ray Cyrus blocked "You Need to Calm Down" from reaching the top spot on the chart. However, the song garnered several chart records for Swift: With six songs reaching the number-two spot, Swift tied Madonna as the female artist with the most number two hits on the chart, having previously reached the spot with "Me!", "I Don't Wanna Live Forever" (2017), "I Knew You Were Trouble" (2013), "Today Was a Fairytale" (2010) and "You Belong with Me" (2009). The song became Swift's twenty-fourth top 10 hit, which is the fifth-most among female artists in the chart's history, behind Madonna (38), Rihanna (31), Mariah Carey (28) and Janet Jackson (27). The single is also Swift's sixteenth song to debut inside the top 10 of the chart, which is the second most top-ten debuts in the chart's history, only behind Drake, who has 20 top-ten debuts, making Swift the first and only female artist with 16 top-ten debuts in the Hot 100 history.

The song debuted at number-one on the Billboard Digital Song Sales charts, selling 79,000 downloads, becoming Swift's record-extending seventeenth number-one hit on that chart. With 12 consecutive weeks spent in the top 20 of the Billboard Hot 100, "You Need to Calm Down" is Swift's song with the longest duration spent in the top 20 since "I Don't Wanna Live Forever" with Zayn Malik in 2017. The track started at number 33 on the Mainstream Top 40 chart, based on three days of airplay, and has since reached number 9.

In Canada, the song entered the Hot AC chart at number 40 based on three days of radio tracking. It debuted at number four on the Canadian Hot 100, becoming the second top five hit from the album in the country.

In the United Kingdom, the song debuted at number five on the UK Singles Chart, becoming Swift's thirteenth top 10 in the UK. In Scotland, the song debuted at number one on the singles chart, becoming Swift's fifth chart topper in the country, as well as her second consecutive number-one hit in Scotland from Lover. In Ireland, the song debuted at number five, tying Swift's previous single, "Me!", which peaked in the week ending May 3, 2019. In Germany, the song debuted at number 37 on the Official German Charts later peaking at number 36. In the Netherlands, the song debuted at number 28 on the Single Top 100 chart. In Belgium, the song arrived at number 11 on the Belgian Ultratip chart later peaking at number three. In Sweden, the song entered at number 55 on the Sverigetopplistan chart later peaking at number 35.

In Australia, the song debuted at number 3 in the ARIA Charts, becoming the second top three hit from the album in the country. In New Zealand, the song entered the Recorded Music NZ singles chart at number 5, becoming Swift's fifteenth top 10 single in the country. The song also topped New Zealand Hot Singles chart.

Music video

The music video was directed by Swift and Drew Kirsch, and executive produced by Swift and Todrick Hall. It was released on June 17, 2019, after a premiere on Good Morning America. The video featured a large number of celebrity cameos, many of whom are LGBT. In order of appearance, the list includes dancer Giuseppe Giofrè, Dexter Mayfield, YouTuber Hannah Hart, actress Laverne Cox, singer Chester Lockhart, entertainer Todrick Hall, singer Hayley Kiyoko, actor Jesse Tyler Ferguson, lawyer Justin Mikita, singer Ciara, Netflix series Queer Eyes Fab Five (Tan France, Bobby Berk, Karamo Brown, Antoni Porowski, Jonathan Van Ness), figure skater Adam Rippon, singer Adam Lambert, television personality Ellen DeGeneres, entertainers Billy Porter and RuPaul, singer Katy Perry, and actor Ryan Reynolds. The appearance of Perry serves as an end to a dispute between her and Swift, although both artists had publicly ended the feud several months prior. Numerous drag queens, all past contestants on RuPaul's Drag Race (Riley Knoxx being the exception), also appear in the video impersonating various female recording artists. Tatianna portrays Ariana Grande, Trinity the Tuck portrays Lady Gaga, Delta Work portrays Adele, Trinity K. Bonet portrays Cardi B, Jade Jolie portrays Swift, Riley Knoxx portrays Beyoncé, Adore Delano portrays Katy Perry and A'keria Chanel Davenport portrays Nicki Minaj. The video was shot in Santa Clarita, California.

Synopsis

The video is set in a colorful trailer park. Swift awakens in her trailer, wearing a bathrobe over a swimsuit, with an embroidery containing the Cher quote "Mom, I am a Rich Man" hanging on a wall. Swift throws her phone onto her bed, which then gives off sparks and starts a fire in the trailer. She nonchalantly walks to a pool, ignoring her burning trailer. She goes into the pool, lying on a float, while looking at the camera and singing. The camera then switches to other residents in the trailer park and their activities, including Mayfield dancing, Hart weightlifting a boombox and Cox watering her yard of plastic flamingoes and greeting Lockhart, who promptly faints.

The scene cuts to Swift walking and dancing down a street with Hall, interspersed with scenes of Kiyoko shooting an arrow into a target with the number "5" (a clue to Swift's next promotional single "The Archer", the fifth track on the album), protestors holding placards with anti-gay slogans (a reference to a real-life religious group that picketed Swift's concerts), Ciara officiating a wedding between Ferguson and Mikita, and Rippon serving snow cones to customers from a stall. Swift also holds a tea party with the Fab Five and Hall. In another trailer, Lambert tattoos the words "Cruel Summer" (later revealed to be a song on the album) onto DeGeneres' right arm. In the next scene, Swift and other residents sun tan while ignoring the heckling protestors, followed by Porter walking down the middle of the two crowds wearing a dress.

The scene shifts to a "pop queen pageant" with the contestants dressed as numerous female singers. RuPaul walks down the lineup with a crown decorated with emeralds and fleur-de-lis motifs, but instead of crowning a winner, he throws it in the air. A food fight begins, with Swift appearing in a french fries costume and Perry in a hamburger suit. The two see and walk towards each other. Elsewhere, Reynolds is portraying Norman Rockwell working on a painting of the Stonewall Inn. Swift and Perry smile, dance and share a hug. At the end of the video, a message appears urging viewers to sign Swift's Change.org petition for the United States Senate to pass the Equality Act.

Reception
The music video received mixed reviews. It received praise for Swift's activism, while criticism was levelled at the execution, particularly the depiction of the anti-LGBT protestors. Many publications including The New York Times, The Washington Post, CNN, and The Irish Times have noted that the song and music video was Swift's most political move yet. Jon Caramanica from The New York Times applauded the inclusion of LGBT celebrities and drag queens as "a worthy celebration", but also wrote it was "plausible cover". Writing in the same review, Wesley Morris questioned the video's release in June to coincide with Pride Month as "tired, tardy or tidily opportunistic", but concluded the video was "a fine thing". Craig Jenkins of Vulture wrote the song and video "has great intentions", but opened up Swift to accusations of queerbaiting and profiting from Pride Month. Dave Holmes from Esquire praised the celebrity cameos, but noted the "ugly and poorly-educated" look of the protestors and the "sexless" portrayal of gay life.

In an opinion piece for NBC News, Michael Arceneaux agreed that Swift "meant well", but criticized the depiction of the anti-gay protestors as "poorer bumpkins", and that the scene between Swift and Katy Perry detracts from the overall pro-gay message. Spencer Kornhaber from The Atlantic stated that "in real-life, Pride counterprotests feature yet-uglier slogans", and "writing off bigotry as negativity... isn't helpful". Nathan Ma from The Independent wrote the protestors could have included politicians who voted for anti-LGBT legislation.

Some publications and LGBTQ+ personalities have defended Swift. Emma Grey Ellis from Wired wrote "the song has spawned more opinions than it has words", and continued "people claimed to despise Swift's lack of politics, and now she is overtly political and they still hate it." De Elizabeth from InStyle opined "a lack of outright activism allowed Swift to become a punching bag". Actor Brian Jordan Alvarez praised the video in an interview with IndieWire, stating that he is "completely grateful anytime anyone, especially someone with a huge platform, expresses positivity, love, and support for the LGBTQ community." Actor Billy Eichner praised Swift's activism, saying "[the LGBT community needs] all the allies we can get." Fashion designer and television personality Tan France, who appeared in the video, called Swift a "powerful ally" and remarked that while LGBT people are often encouraged to take their time to come out, the same is not extended to allies.

Accolades
The song was nominated for nine awards at the 2019 MTV Video Music Awards, including the category Video of the Year, becoming the most nominated video of the night. It is also Swift's second victory for Video of the Year following "Bad Blood" in 2015, joining Beyoncé and Rihanna as the only female acts to win the category twice and the fourth artist overall. It also won Video for Good. The song was nominated for Best Pop Solo Performance at the 62nd Annual Grammy Awards, becoming her third nod in the category, following "Shake It Off" (2015) and "Blank Space" (2016).

Impact 
On June 1, 2019, Swift initiated a petition on Change.org, titled "Support the Equality Act", in favor of the United States Senate's support in passing the pro-LGBT "Equality Act" in the country's Congress; the act bans discrimination "on the basis of the sex, sexual orientation, gender identity, or pregnancy, childbirth, or a related medical condition of an individual, as well as because of sex-based stereotypes". A message urging the viewers to sign the petition appears at the end of the "You Need to Calm Down" music video; it states: "Let's show our pride by demanding that, on a national level, our laws truly treat all of our citizens equally. Please sign my petition for Senate support of the Equality Act on Change.org". As of April 12, 2020, the petition had over 704,000 signatures, including those from Democratic senators and presidential candidates like Elizabeth Warren, Amy Klobuchar, Ed Markey, Kirsten Gillibrand, Tim Kaine, Cory Brooker and Beto O'Rourke. Swift also addressed a letter to Republican senator Lamar Alexander of Tennessee, her home state, asking him and the other senators to support the act: "For American citizens to be denied jobs or housing based on who they love or how they identify is un-American and cruel".

The release of "You Need to Calm Down" further led to a spike in individual donations to GLAAD, an American LGBT non-governmental organization, as the lyrics of the song namechecks the organization: "why are you mad when you could be GLAAD?". In response, GLAAD started a Facebook fundraiser for fans to support the advocacy work for Pride Month, with $1300 as a goal since 13 is Swift's lucky number. Anthony Ramos, Director of Talent Management at GLAAD, stated that Swift "is one of the world's biggest pop stars; the fact that she continues to use her platform and music to support the LGBTQ community and the Equality Act is a true sign of being an ally. 'You Need to Calm Down' is the perfect Pride anthem, and we're thrilled to see Taylor standing with the LGBTQ community to promote inclusivity, equality, and acceptance this Pride month". Ramos also highlighted that many of the individual donations were made in the amount of $13. Sarah Kate, the CEO and President of GLAAD, stated: "Taylor Swift continues to use her platform to speak out against discrimination and create a world where everyone can live the life they love. GLAAD is so thankful for her donation to support our advocacy efforts and for her ongoing work to speak out for what is fair, just, and LGBTQ inclusive. In today's divisive political and cultural climate, we need more allies like Taylor, who send positive and uplifting messages to LGBTQ people everywhere".

On August 26, 2019, Swift won the Video of the Year award for the "You Need to Calm Down" music video at the 2019 MTV Video Music Awards; in her speech, Swift urged the audience and the viewers to sign her petition, and pointed out that the White House has not responded to the petition despite having "five times the amount of signatures that it would need to warrant a response". The televised speech led to a surge in the number of signatures on the petition. The next day, the White House issued a statement. Judd Deere, the White House deputy Press Secretary, stated that "the Trump administration absolutely opposes discrimination of any kind and supports the equal treatment of all; however, the House-passed bill in its current form is filled with poison pills that threaten to undermine parental and conscience rights". "You Need to Calm Down" went on to become a gay anthem.

Live performances, covers and usage in media
Swift performed the song live for the first time at the Amazon Prime Day Concert on July 10, 2019. On August 22, she performed the song at a Good Morning America concert in Central Park. The next day, she performed an acoustic rendition of the song at a SiriusXM Town Hall. She also performed it at the 2019 MTV Video Music Awards along with "Lover" and included the song in her setlist for BBC Radio 1's Live Lounge on September 2. On September 9, Swift performed the song at the City of Lover one-off concert in Paris, France; this concert live version was released to digital music and music streaming platforms on May 17, 2020. While promoting Lover, Swift performed the song at the We Can Survive charity concert in Los Angeles on October 19, at the Alibaba Singles' Day Gala in Shanghai, China on November 10, at Capital FM's Jingle Bell Ball 2019 in London on December 8, and at iHeartRadio Z100's Jingle Ball in New York City on December 13. Swift included "You Need to Calm Down" on the set list for the Eras Tour (2023).

British rock band Yonaka covered the song for their Spotify Singles edition in August 2019. American singer-songwriter Kelly Clarkson covered the song in an episode of her television show, The Kelly Clarkson Show, to commemorate the 2020 Pride Month. YouTube user John Fassold mashed the song up with "Ripped Pants" from the cartoon SpongeBob SquarePants, "Jump Up, Super Star!" from the video game Super Mario Odyssey, and Mozart's "The Marriage of Figaro," among others. "You Need to Calm Down" was featured in a commercial for Amazon Music. In June 2021, as part of a project on human rights, students of Barking and Dagenham College made a video to "You Need to Calm Down" for Pride Month. The song was used in a commercial Swift narrated for the United States women's national soccer team competing at the 2020 Summer Olympics.

Credits and personnel
Credits adapted from Tidal.

 Taylor Swift – vocals, songwriter, producer
 Joel Little – producer, songwriter, drum programmer, keyboard, recording engineer
 Şerban Ghenea – mixer
 John Hanes – mix engineer

Charts

Weekly charts

Year-end charts

Certifications

Release history

See also

 List of Billboard Hot 100 top-ten singles in 2019
 List of number-one digital songs of 2019 (U.S.)
 List of number one singles in Scotland (2019)
 List of UK top-ten singles in 2019
 List of top 10 singles in 2019 (Australia)

References

2019 songs
2019 singles
Taylor Swift songs
Republic Records singles
American synth-pop songs
LGBT-related songs
Protest songs
Songs about the media
Songs against racism and xenophobia
Songs written by Taylor Swift
Songs written by Joel Little
Song recordings produced by Taylor Swift
Song recordings produced by Joel Little
Music videos directed by Taylor Swift
MTV Video of the Year Award
MTV Video Music Award for Best Video with a Social Message
Electropop songs